Happy Madison Productions  is an American film and television production company founded in 1999 by Adam Sandler, which is best known for its comedy films. Happy Madison takes its name from the films Happy Gilmore and Billy Madison, two box office successes starring Sandler himself, both produced by Robert Simonds, written by Sandler and Tim Herlihy, and distributed by Universal Pictures. 

In addition to various Sandler-produced films, the company has also released films produced by others, such as Steven Brill (Little Nicky, Mr. Deeds), Dennis Dugan (The Benchwarmers, I Now Pronounce You Chuck and Larry, You Don't Mess with the Zohan, Grown Ups, Grown Ups 2), Frank Coraci (Click, Zookeeper, Blended), Fred Wolf (Strange Wilderness, The House Bunny), Tom Brady (The Animal, The Hot Chick, Bucky Larson: Born to Be a Star), Peter Segal (Anger Management, 50 First Dates, The Longest Yard), and Nicholaus Goossen (A Day with the Meatball, Grandma's Boy, The Shortcut).

The 1998 films The Waterboy and The Wedding Singer helped jump start Sandler's movie career and production company. He produced The Waterboy and co-wrote the script with Tim Herlihy. The film was extremely profitable, earning over $160 million in the United States alone and made Sandler a successful actor with The Waterboy becoming his second $100 million film in a year, along with The Wedding Singer.

The company's production offices were formerly located in the Judy Garland Building on the Sony Pictures Studios lot in Culver City but the company left after completion of Sandler's final contracted film for the studio, Pixels. Happy Madison, Inc. the parent company of Happy Madison Productions is run by Adam Sandler's brother Scott and is located in Manchester, New Hampshire.

Its subsidiary Madison 23 Productions, was aimed towards the drama genre. It only produced two films Reign Over Me and Funny People, which both starred Sandler himself. Another subsidiary was Scary Madison Productions, which was aimed towards the horror genre and only produced the film The Shortcut.

Filmography

Film

Television

Critical reception
Happy Madison's films have, for the most part, received overwhelmingly negative reviews, with most criticism targeted towards the crude humor, excessive product placement, celebrity cameos, and a sentimental ending that contradicted the film's mostly mean-spirited tone. Though some drama films (Reign Over Me, Funny People and Hustle) received mixed-to-positive from critics, with Sandler's performance garnering critical praise. The production company has put out four films considered to be some of the worst ever made, including two that have received a 0% score from Rotten Tomatoes.

References

External links
 Happy Madison page on Sandler's website

 
American companies established in 1999
1999 establishments in California
Film production companies of the United States
Television production companies of the United States
Companies based in Culver City, California
Mass media companies established in 1999